Mill en Sint Hubert is a former municipality in the province of North Brabant, the Netherlands. 

Mill en Sint Hubert, Boxmeer, Cuijk, Grave, and Sint Anthonis merged into the new municipality of Land van Cuijk on 1 January 2022.

Population centres

Topography

Map of the former municipality of Mill en Sint Hubert, 2015

Notable people 
 Kees Bastiaans (1909 in Mill - 1986 in Mill) a Dutch Expressionist painter 
 Reinout Oerlemans (born 1971 in Mill) a Dutch soap opera actor, film director, TV presenter and producer 
 Jochen Miller (born 1979 in Langenboom) a trance musician and progressive house DJ
 Janneke van Tienen (born 1979 in Mill) a volleyball player

Image gallery

References

External links

Official website

Former municipalities of North Brabant
Municipalities of the Netherlands disestablished in 2022
Geography of Land van Cuijk